The Battle of Gura was fought on 7–10 March 1876 between the Ethiopian Empire and the Khedivate of Egypt near the town of Gura in Eritrea. It was the second and decisive major battle of the Ethiopian–Egyptian War.

Background
The Egyptian army invaded the Ethiopian Empire from its coastal possessions in what is now Eritrea, and met that of Emperor Yohannes at Gundet on the morning of 16 November 1875. 

After the defeat at Gundet, the Egyptians sent a much larger, well-armed force to attempt a second invasion.  This army moved to Gura plain, and made two forts there: "Gura" fort and "Khaya Khor" fort. Gura fort was garrisoned by 7,500 men led by Rateb Pasha and ex Confederate general William Wing Loring and Khaya Khor fort was garrisoned by 5,500 men led by Uthman Rifqi. Yohannes soon arrived in the area with a huge army of over 50,000 men mobilized from the provinces of Tigray, Gondar and Hamasien.

Taking advantage of the lack of Egyptian reconnaissance, the Ethiopians positioned themselves on the Godolfelassie road, Yohannes could now strike Gura, Khaya Khor or Keren. Fearing an attack on the supply depots, Rateb Pasha decided to send 5,000 out of his 7,500 strong force to attack the Ethiopian army, believing that dug-in Egyptian forces were unbeatable by enemies who did not posses artillery, such as the Abyssinians. The 5,000 strong Egyptian infantry of Gura fort sortied out early on March 7. Little did they know, Ethiopian scouts had spotted their movements and prepared to attack the heavily outnumbered Egyptians.

Battle

On March 7, the Egyptians that left the fort were attacked by the Ethiopians and surrounded. Most of the Ethiopians were armed with firearms, and although they had only one field-gun, it is said to have had no effect in deciding the action. The accounts of the American officers are silent on the point; but it is said that Rateb Pasha allowed his views to be overruled by Loring Pasha, who insisted on the ramps of the trenches which had been erected being razed, so that the artillery could have a clear zone of fire. 

The gunners and infantry were enfiladed by the Ethiopians from higher ground, and the slaughter was so great that several regiments became completely demoralized. Those officers who attempted to rally their men and the survivors, were accused generally of joining in the panic, and of cowardice in the field. The Egyptian troops and officers were called upon to fight under conditions hitherto unknown to them, and without the benefit of tried and skilled leaders. The result was inevitable. Soon the whole Egyptian brigade retreated in complete panic. In this stampede, many of the Egyptian infantry who were falling into ravines or slowed down by the thorny acacias were slaughtered in great numbers as they fled back to Gura fort. According to Lockett out of the 5,000 Egyptians that sortied out only a few hundred managed to return to the fort.

William Wing Loring describes the battle in his memoirs;

Uthman Rifqi and his garrison of 5,500 men viewed the entire engagement from their fort at Khaya Khor but decided not to join the battle.

The Ethiopians followed up their success, and closely invested Fort Gura, which they attacked in force on the 8th and 9th of March. On March 10, Rashid Pasha and Osman Bey Neghib led an attack on the Ethiopians which was repulsed with loss, and both officers were killed while leading their men. The Ethiopians then withdrew to loot the dead and collect the rifles which the Egyptian troops had abandoned. Most of the artillery was lost, as well as considerable quantities of rifle ammunition.

Aftermath
After the withdrawal of the Ethiopians, the angered Egyptians left their forts and burned the wounded enemies alive. The Ethiopians retaliated by a cold-blooded massacre of about 600 Egyptian prisoners whom they had taken. Among these prisoners killed were Dr. Muhammad Ali Pasha and Neghib Bey Muhammad. Dr Badr (who had been educated in Edinburgh) escaped by the assistance of an Ethiopian girl who discovered him wounded. On March 12, an amnesty was arranged, and Monsieur Sarzac (the French consul at Massawa) went over the battlefield where the survivors of the Egyptian army were collected, and reached Massawa in May.

News of this defeat was suppressed in Egypt for fear that it would undermine the government of the Khedivate. The victory helped Emperor Yohannes solidify his control over the Ethiopian Empire broadly, and control over the Mareb Melash specifically. He would appoint then Shaleqa Alula as the Ras of those areas of this region under imperial authority.

See also
 Ethiopian–Egyptian War
 Battle of Adwa
 Military history of Ethiopia

References

Further reading
A Confederate Soldier in Egypt - W.W. Loring

Military history of Egypt
Battles involving Ethiopia
Battles involving Egypt
1876 in Africa
1876 in Egypt
1876 in Ethiopia
Egypt–Ethiopia relations